Seyyed Baqer (also Romanized as Seyyed Bāqer) is a village in Bivanij Rural District, in the Central District of Dalahu County, Kermanshah Province, Iran. At the 2006 census, its population was 26, in 4 families.

References 

Populated places in Dalahu County